Iglesia de Santo Tomás (Coro) is a church in Asturias, Spain.

Churches in Asturias
Bien de Interés Cultural landmarks in Asturias